John Creswell (fl. 1597) was an English politician.

He was the deputy Recorder for the town of Leominster in Herefordshire. In 1597 he was elected Member (MP) of the Parliament of England for the borough.

References

16th-century births
Year of death missing
English MPs 1597–1598